The Family Federation for World Peace and Unification, widely known as the Unification Church, is a new religious movement, derived from Christianity, whose members are called Unificationists or "Moonies". It was officially founded on 1 May 1954 under the name Holy Spirit Association for the Unification of World Christianity (HSA-UWC) in Seoul, South Korea, by Sun Myung Moon (1920–2012). Moon and his wife Hak Ja Han are its the leaders, and are honored by its members as their "True Parents".

The beliefs of the Unification Church are based on Moon's book the Divine Principle. Moon considered himself the Second Coming of Jesus Christ, claiming to complete the mission started by Jesus of beginning a new family, and eventually a larger human lineage, free from sin. The Unification Church is well known for its "Blessing" or mass wedding ceremonies. It has been criticized for its teachings and for its social influence, with some critics calling it a "dangerous cult".  Its involvement in politics include anti-communism and support for Korean reunification.  Its members have founded, owned, and supported other related business, educational, political, and other types of organizations.

Popular terminologies 

Moon did not originally intend on founding a separate organization or denomination, and did not give his group of followers its official name, Holy Spirit Association for the Unification of World Christianity (Korean: 세계 기독교 통일 신령 협회 Segye Gidoggyo Tong-il Sinryeong Hyeobhoe), until 1954. The informal name "Unification Church" has been commonly used by members, the public, and the news media.

Moonie is a colloquial term first used in 1974 by some American media outlets. Unification Church members have used the word, including Moon himself, the president of the Unification Theological Seminary David Kim, and Bo Hi Pak, Moon's aide and president of Little Angels Children's Folk Ballet of Korea. In the 1980s and 1990s the Unification Church of the United States undertook an extensive public relations campaign against the use of the word by the news media.  In other contexts it is still sometimes used and not always considered pejorative. By 2018, the term "Unification Movement" was widely used.

Moon and his wife, Hak Ja Han, are regarded by Unificationists as "True Father" and "True Mother", respectively, and as "True Parents" collectively.

History

Background and origins 

On 25 February 1920,  Moon was born Mun Yong-myeong in Sangsa-ri, Deogun-myon, Jeongju-gun, North P'yŏng'an Province, at a time when Korea was under Japanese rule. His birthday was recorded as January 6 by the traditional lunar calendar (25 February 1920, according to the Gregorian Calendar).  Around 1930, his family, who followed traditional Confucianist beliefs,  converted to Christianity and joined a Presbyterian Church, where he later taught Sunday school.

After World War II and the Japanese rule ended in 1945, Moon began preaching. In 1946, Moon traveled alone to Pyongyang in Communist-ruled North Korea. He was arrested on allegations of spying for South Korea and given a five-year sentence to the Hŭngnam labor camp.

Holy Spirit Association for the Unification of World Christianity (1954–1994) 

Moon founded the Holy Spirit Association for the Unification of World Christianity (HSA-UWC) in Seoul on 1 May 1954. It expanded rapidly in South Korea and by the end of 1955, had 30 centers throughout the nation. The HSA-UWC expanded throughout the world with most members living in South Korea, Japan, the Philippines, and other nations in East Asia. In the 1970s, American HSA-UWC members were noted for raising money forUnification Churchprojects.

The HSA-UWC also sent missionaries to Europe. They entered Czechoslovakia in 1968 and remained underground until the 1990s. Unification movement activity in South America began in the 1970s with missionary work. Later, the HSA-UWC made large investments in civic organizations and business projects, including an international newspaper.  Starting in the 1990s, the HSA-UWC expanded in Russia and other former communist nations. Hak Ja Han, Moon's wife, made a radio broadcast to the nation from the State Kremlin Palace. As of 1994, the HSA-UWC had about 5,000 members in Russia. About 500 Russian students had been sent to the US to participate in 40-day workshops.

Moon moved to the United States in 1971, although he remained a citizen of the Republic of Korea. In the 1970s, he gave a series of public speeches in the United States, including one in Madison Square Garden in New York City in 1974; two in 1976 in Yankee Stadium in New York City; and one on the grounds of the Washington Monument in Washington, DC, where he spoke on "God's Hope for America" to 300,000 people. In 1975, the HSA-UWC held one of the largest peaceful gatherings in history, with 1.2 million people in Yeouido, South Korea.

In the 1970s, the Unification Church, along with some other new religious movements, became a target of the anti-cult movement.  Activists have accused the movement of having "brainwashed" its members.  In 1976, AmericanUnification Churchpresident Neil Albert Salonen met with Senator Bob Dole to defend the HSA–UWC against charges which were made by its critics, including the parents of some members.

Starting in the 1980s, Moon instructed HSA-UWC members to take part in a program called "Home Church" in which they reached out to neighbors and community members through public service.

In April 1990, Moon visited the Soviet Union and met with President Mikhail Gorbachev. Moon expressed support for the political and economic transformations underway in the Soviet Union. At the same time, the movement was expanding into formerly communist nations.

Family Federation for World Peace and Unification (1994–) 

On 1 May 1994 (the 40th anniversary of the founding of the HSA-UWC), Moon declared that the era of the HSA-UWC had ended and inaugurated a new organization: the Family Federation for World Peace and Unification (FFWPU) would include HSA-UWC members and members of other religious organizations working toward common goals, especially on issues of sexual morality and reconciliation between people of different religions, nations, and races. The FFWPU co-sponsored Blessing ceremonies in which thousands of couples from other churches and religions were given the marriage blessing previously given only to HSA-UWC members.

In the 1980s and 1990s the Church's membership declined and its businesses expanded greatly and encountered significant success leading to it growing wealthy, despite its declining numbers.  In 1994, The New York Times recognized the movement's political influence, saying it was "a theocratic powerhouse that is pouring foreign fortunes into conservative causes in the United States." In 1998, the Egyptian newspaper Al-Ahram criticized Moon's "ultra-right leanings" and suggested a personal relationship with conservative Israeli prime minister Benjamin Netanyahu.

In 1995, the former U.S. President George H. W. Bush and his wife, Barbara Bush, spoke at a FFWPU event in the Tokyo Dome. Bush told the gathering: "If as president I could have done one thing to have helped the country more, it would have been to do a better job in finding a way, either through speaking out or through raising a moral standard, to strengthen the American family." Hak Ja Han, the main speaker, credited her husband with bringing about the Fall of Communism and declared that he must save America from "the destruction of the family and moral decay".

In 2000, Moon founded the World Association of Non-Governmental Organizations (WANGO), which describes itself as "a global organization whose mission is to serve its member organizations, strengthen and encourage the non-governmental sector as a whole, increase public understanding of the non-governmental community, and provide the mechanism and support needed for NGOs to connect, partner, and multiply their contributions to solve humanity's basic problems." It has been criticized for promoting conservatism in contrast to some of the ideals of the United Nations.

In 2000, the FFWPU co-sponsored the Million Family March, a rally in Washington, D.C., to celebrate family unity and racial and religious harmony, along with the Nation of Islam. Louis Farrakhan was the main speaker at the event which was held on 16 October 2000; the fifth anniversary of the Million Man March, which was also organized by Farrakhan. FFWPU leader Dan Fefferman wrote to his colleagues acknowledging that Farrakhan's and Moon's views differed on multiple issues but shared a view of a "God-centered family".

In 2003, Korean FFWPU members started a political party in South Korea, "The Party for God, Peace, Unification, and Home". An inauguration declaration stated the new party would focus on preparing for Korean reunification by educating the public about God and peace. A FFWPU official said that similar political parties would be started in Japan and the United States. Since 2003, the FFWPU-related Universal Peace Federation's Middle East Peace Initiative has been organizing group tours of Israel and Palestine to promote understanding, respect, and reconciliation among Jews, Muslims, and Christians.

On 15 August 2012, Moon was reported to be gravely ill and was put on a respirator at the intensive care unit of St. Mary's Hospital at The Catholic University of Korea in Seoul. He was admitted on 14 August 2012, after suffering from pneumonia earlier in the month. He died there on September 2.

Moon was a member of the Honorary Committee of the Unification Ministry of the Republic of Korea. The church member Jae-jung Lee had been once a unification minister of the Republic of Korea. Another, Ek Nath Dhakal, is a member of the Nepalese Constituent Assembly, and a first Minister for Co-operatives and Poverty Alleviation Ministry of the Government of Nepal. In 2016, a study sponsored by the Unification Theological Seminary found that American members were divided in their choices in the 2016 United States presidential election, with the largest bloc supporting Senator Bernie Sanders.

Hak Ja Han has been acting as a leader and public spokesperson for the movement. In 2019, she spoke at a rally in Japan and called for greater understanding and cooperation between the Pacific Rim nations. In 2020, she spoke at a UPF sponsored in-person and virtual rally for Korean unification, which drew about one million attendees.

In 2021, Donald Trump and Shinzo Abe gave speeches at the Rally of Hope event hosted by an affiliate of the Unification Church. Five ministers of the Cabinet of Japan  have relationships with the Unification Church, including the Minister of Health, Labour, and Welfare and the head of the Ministry of Internal Affairs and Communications.

Beliefs  

Moon's teachings, called the Divine Principle, were first published as Wolli Wonbon ("Original Text of the Divine Principle") in 1945. The earliest manuscript was lost in North Korea during the Korean War. A second, expanded version, Wonli Hesol, or Explanation of the Divine Principle, was published in 1957.  The  or Exposition of the Divine Principle is the main theological textbook of the movement. It was co-written by Sun Myung Moon and early disciple Hyo Won'eu and first published in 1966. A translation entitled Divine Principle was published in English in 1973. The Divine Principle lays out the core ofUnification Churchtheology and is held by its believers to have the status of holy scripture. Following the format of systematic theology, it includes God's purpose in creating human beings, the fall of man, and restorationthe process through history by which God is working to remove the ill effects of the fall and restore humanity back to the relationship and position that God originally intended. David Václavík and Dušan Lužný described the details of those 3 points as follows:

 Principle of Creation: This first principle states that God created the world in His image. All of reality is then composed of bipolarities. The basic bipolarity is expressed by the terms sung-sang (성상,性相,"inner character" – the inner, invisible aspect of the created world) and hyung-sang (형상,形相, "outer form" – the outer, visible aspect of the created world). In addition to this, there is another bipolarity, denoted by the terms yin and yang. The first-mentioned bipolarity of sung-sang and hyung-sang reflects the relationship between soul (mind) and matter (body), while yin-yang reflects the relationship between femininity and masculinity. Hierarchy, described by the first principle (the basis of the four positions) then guarantees order in the world – God or higher purpose is placed highest, in the middle are man and woman, and finally, children are placed as the result. As Václavík and Lužný further characterize the doctrine, "God is an absolute reality transcending time and space. The fundamental energy of God's being is also eternal. By the action of this energy, entities enter into a relationship with each other, the basis of which is the activity of giving and receiving. The goal is to achieve a balanced and harmonious relationship of giving and receiving, i.e., love." According to the teachings of the Church, the highest level of relationship is the relationship with God. By properly developing the relationship of giving and receiving, it should be possible to achieve union with God. The goal of creation is then the realization of the kingdom of heaven and can be achieved by fulfilling the three biblical blessings. Principle describes three blessings as follows. The first blessing concerns the nature of man: God created man in his own image. The second blessing was to be fulfilled through Adam and Eve by establishing an ideal family that was pure and loving, but they failed to do so. The third blessing concerns man's position as a mediator between God and nature. Man is to master nature in order to perfect himself and nature itself and thus create the kingdom of heaven. Principle then describes three stages of growth of everything including man, namely, origin (formation), growth, and completion.
 The Fall of Man: according to the teaching of the Church, there was no fulfillment of God's plan. God endowed man with free will and responsibility. Like everything in the universe, Adam and Eve went through three phases of development (origin, growth, and completion). This part describes, that before completion could occur, Adam and Eve disobeyed God's command and had illicit sexual intercourse during the growth phase. As a result, the orientation of the give-and-take relationship was reversed, and a departure from God and a relationship with Satan was established. Thus happen the fall of man and the creation of a world "with Satan at the center, and all men have become children of Satan." According to this belief, the world is from that time dominated by Satan, and men with evil natures transmit evil. Through their children, they then create evil families and thus an evil world.
 The principle of restoration: According to the teaching of the Church, the primary purpose of creation was to build the Kingdom of Heaven on earth. This means that God will eventually save this sinful world and restore it to its original, sinless state. This is the basis of the principle of restoration. This is the perspective through which the Unification Church views the entire history of humanity. For the church, history is the history of restoration and of God's efforts to save fallen men. At the end of this history, the Last Days are to come. Restoration teaches, that God has tried to end the sinful world and restore the original good world several times in human history. But men have failed in their responsibility and thwarted God's will. Doctrine claims that God made several such attempts: in the case of Noah, God first destroyed the sinful world with a flood, yet Noah's secondborn son Ham sinned again. Another attempt to restore the original sinless world was the coming of Jesus Christ when God sent the Messiah to establish the perfect family and thus create the Kingdom of Heaven on earth. Jesus did not fulfill this mission because He was crucified. Václavík and Lužný summarize: "According to the doctrine of the Unification Church, we are currently living in the period of the Last Days, that is, the period of the Second Coming of Christ. However, today's situation is very different from previous ones. For Christ will be successful at His Second Coming – God will send the 'True Parents of humanity' and through them fulfill the purpose of creation. During the previous two thousand years, God has prepared, according to the principle of restoration, a suitable democratic, social, and legal environment that will protect Christ at the Second Coming."

Followers take as a starting point the truth of the Christian Old and New Testaments, with the Divine Principle an additional text that intends to interpret and "fulfill" the purpose of those older texts. Moon was intent on replacing worldwide forms of Christianity with his new unified vision of it, Moon being a self-declared messiah. Moon's followers regard him as a separate person from Jesus but with a mission to basically continue and complete Jesus's work in a new way, according to the Principle. TheUnification Churchregards a person's destination after death as being dependent on how much one's work during this life corresponds to its teachings. Moon's followers believe in  Apocatastasis, that everyone will eventually receive salvation.

In 1977, Frederick Sontag analyzed the teachings of the Divine Principle and summarized it in 12 concise points:

 God: Divine Principle teaches, that there is one living, eternal and true God, a person beyond space and time, who has a perfect reason, emotion, and will, whose deepest heart essence is love, which includes both masculinity and femininity, a person who is the source of all truth, beauty and goodness, and who is the creator and sustainer of man, the universe and all things visible and invisible. Man and the universe reflect his personality, character, and purpose.
 Man: Man was then created by God as a unique creature, made in His image as His children, like Him in personality and character, and created with the capacity to respond to His love, to be a source of His joy, and to share His creativity.
 God's desire for man and creation: To the relationship between God and Man teaching says, that God's desire for man and creation is eternal and unchanging, God wants men and women to fulfill three things: First, each should grow to perfection so as to become one with God in heart, will, and action, so that their mind and body are united in perfect harmony centered on God's love; second, to be united with God as husband and wife and give birth to God's sinless children, thereby establishing a sinless family and ultimately a sinless world; third, to become masters of the created world, establishing loving dominion with Him in a mutual relationship of giving and receiving. None of this happened because of human sin. Therefore, God's present desire is to solve the sin problem and restore all these things, which will bring about the earthly and heavenly kingdom of God.
 Sin: Divine Principle describes the origin of sin and the process of the fall of man. The first man and woman (Adam and Eve), before they became perfect, were tempted by the archangel Lucifer to illicit love. Because of this, Adam and Eve willfully turned away from God's will and purpose, bringing spiritual death to themselves and the human race. As a result of this Fall, Satan usurped the position of the true father of mankind, so that all humans since then have been born in sin both physically and spiritually and have sinful tendencies. Therefore, human beings tend to resist God and His will and live in ignorance as to their true nature and parentage and all that they have lost thereby. Thus God suffers for lost children and a lost world and has had to constantly struggle to restore them to Himself. Creation groans to give birth while waiting to be reunited through the true children of God.
 Christology: According to the Divine Principle, fallen humanity can only be restored to God through Christ (the Messiah) who comes as the new Adam to become the new head of the human race through whom humanity can be reborn into the family of God. In order for God to send the Messiah, mankind must fulfill certain conditions that restore, what was lost because of the Fall.
 History: Divine Principle describes, that restoration is accomplished through the payment of the indemnity for a sin. Human history is then a record of God's and man's efforts to make this indemnity over time so that the conditions can be met and God can send the Messiah who comes to begin the final process of restoration. If some efforts fail in fulfilling the conditions of indemnity, they must be repeated, usually by another person after a period of time. This, according to the Divine Principle, is why history shows cyclical patterns. History culminates with the coming of the Messiah, which ends the old age and begins a new age.
 Resurrection: Divine Principle explains resurrection as the process of restoration to spiritual life and spiritual maturity, ultimately uniting a person with God. It is the transition from spiritual death to spiritual life. This should be accomplished in part by human effort (through prayer, good works, etc.) with the help of the saints in the spirit world and completed by God's effort to bring man to new birth through Christ (the Messiah).
 Predestination: According to Divine Principle, God has predestined absolutely that all men will be restored to Him and have chosen all men for salvation, but He has also given man a portion of responsibility (to be fulfilled by man's free will) for the fulfillment of His original will and His will to bring about restoration. This responsibility remains permanently with man. God has predestined and called certain persons and groups of people to certain responsibilities. If these fail, others must fill their role and greater compensation must be made.
 Jesus: Divine Principle teaches, that Jesus of Nazareth came as the Christ, the second Adam, the only begotten Son of God. He became one with God, spoke God's words, and did God's works, thus showing God to men. However, people eventually rejected and crucified him, preventing him from building God's kingdom on earth. Divine Principle teaches that Jesus overcame Satan in the crucifixion and resurrection, making spiritual salvation possible for those who are born again through him and the Holy Spirit. The restoration of the Kingdom of God on earth awaits the Second Coming of Christ.
 Bible: Divine Principle offers an explanation of the Scriptures of the Old and New Testaments. Both should be the record of God's progressive revelation to mankind. The purpose of the Bible, according to the Divine Principle, is to bring us to Christ and reveal to us the heart of God. Divine Principle supports Bible, as the truth is unique, eternal, and unchanging, so any new messages from God will be consistent with the Bible and will contain deeper explanations. Divine Principle describes the current time as the last days when the new truth must be communicated by God (in the book 'God's Principle') so that mankind will be able to finish what is still unfinished.
 The ultimate renewal: According to the Divine Principle, a proper understanding of theology focuses simultaneously on man's relationship with God (vertical) and man's relationship with his neighbor (horizontal). Man's sin has disrupted both of these relationships and thus caused all the problems in our world. These problems will be solved through the restoration of man to God through Christ, as well as through such measures as establishing appropriate moral standards and practices, forming true families uniting all peoples and races (Oriental, Western, and African), resolving the tension between science and religion, correcting economic, racial, political, and educational injustices, and overcoming God-denying ideologies such as Communism.
 The Second Coming (Eschatology): Divine principle teaches, that Christ's Second Coming will occur in our age, which would be similar to the time of His First Coming. Christ should come as before, that is, as a man in the flesh. By marrying His bride in the flesh, He will establish a family and thus become the True Parents of all mankind. Through accepting the 'True Parents(참부모)' (the Second Coming of Christ), obeying them, and following them, the original sin of mankind would be removed and people can eventually become perfect. In this way, true families fulfilling God's ideal will begin, and the Kingdom of God's will should be established both on earth and in heaven. According to the Divine Principle, this day is now at hand in the person of Sun Myung Moon.

Traditions

Blessing ceremony 

The Unification Church is well known for its Blessing tradition: a mass wedding ceremony (합동결혼식) and wedding vow renewal ceremony. It is given to engaged or married couples. According to the Church's belief in a serpent seed interpretation of original sin and the Fall of Man, Eve was sexually seduced by Satan, and thus the human bloodline is sinful due to being directly descended from Satan. Through the Blessing, members believe, the couple is removed from the lineage of sinful humanity and restored back into God's sinless lineage. 

The first Blessing ceremony was held in 1961 for 36 couples in Seoul, South Korea by the Moons shortly after their own marriage in 1960. All the couples were members of the church. Moon matched all of the couples except 12 who were already married to each other before joining the church. This was Moon's second marriage. In 1945 he married Sun Kil Choi. They had a son in 1946 and divorced in 1954.

Later Blessing ceremonies were larger in scale but followed the same pattern. All participants were HSA-UWC members and Moon matched most of the couples. In 1982 the first large scale Blessing (of 2,000 couples) outside of Korea took place in Madison Square Garden, New York City. In 1988, Moon matched 2,500 Korean members with Japanese members for a Blessing ceremony held in Korea, partly in order to promote unity between the two nations.

Moon's practice of matching couples was very unusual in both Christian tradition and in modern Western culture and attracted much attention and controversy.  The Blessing ceremonies have attracted a lot of attention in the press and in the public imagination, often being labeled "mass weddings". However, in most cases the Blessing ceremony is not a legal wedding ceremony. Some couples are already married and those that are engaged are later legally married according to the laws of their own countries. The New York Times referred to a 1997 ceremony for 28,000 couples as a "marriage affirmation ceremony", adding: "The real weddings were held later in separate legal ceremonies."

Mary Farrell Bednarowski says that marriage is "really the only sacrament" in the Unification movement. Unificationists therefore view singleness as "not a state to be sought or cultivated" but as preparation for marriage.  Pre-marital celibacy and marital faithfulness are emphasized. Adherents may be taught to "abstain from intimate relations for a specified time after marriage".  The church does not give its marriage blessing to same-sex couples.
Moon has emphasized the similarity between Unification views of sexuality and evangelical Christianity, "reaching out to conservative Christians in this country in the last few years by emphasizing shared goals like support for sexual abstinence outside of marriage, and opposition to homosexuality."  Since 2001 couples Blessed by Moon have been able to arrange marriages for their own children, without his direct guidance. Also some Unification Church members have married partners who are not church members.

Holy days 
Holy Days of the Unification Church:

 True God's Day, (하나님의 날,established 1. January 1968) - always 1. January until 2009, then according to the lunar calendar - 23. January 2012
 True Parents' Birthday (참부모성탄 or 기원절,6. January 1920 - 6. January 1943) - Anniversary of the Coronation Ceremony for the Kingship of God (2001), 6. January until 2009, then according to the lunar calendar - 28. January 2012
 True Parents' Day, (참부모의 날,established 1. March 1960 according to the lunar calendar) - 28. January 2012
 Day of All True Things, (참만물의날established 1. May 1963 according to the lunar calendar) - 20. June 2012
 Chil Il Jeol(칠일절) - Declaration Day of God's Eternal Blessing(하나님
축복영원
선포일, Founded 1. July 1991) - always 1. July until 2009, then according to the lunar calendar - 18. August 2012
 Chil Pal Cheol(칠팔절) or Declaration of the Realm of the Cosmic Sabbath for the Parents of Heaven and Earth (천지부모
천주안식권
선포일)- founded 7. July 1997 according to the lunar calendar) - 24. August 2012
 True Children's Day, (참자녀의
날,established on 1. October 1960 according to the lunar calendar) - 14. November 2012
 Foundation Day for the Nation of Heaven and Earth, (천주통일국
개천일,founded 3. October 1988) - always 3. October until 2009, then 16. November 2012 according to the lunar calendar

Scholarly studies 

In the early 1960s John Lofland lived with HSA-UWC missionary Young Oon Kim and a small group of American members and studied their activities in trying to promote their beliefs and win new members. Lofland noted that most of their efforts were ineffective and that most of the people who joined did so because of personal relationships with other members, often family relationships. Lofland published his findings in 1964 as a doctoral thesis entitled "The World Savers: A Field Study of Cult Processes", and in 1966 in book form by Prentice-Hall as Doomsday Cult: A Study of Conversion, Proselytization, and Maintenance of Faith.

In 1977 Frederick Sontag, a professor of philosophy at Pomona College and a minister in the United Church of Christ., spent 10 months visiting HSA-UWC members in North America, Europe, and Asia as well as interviewing Moon at his home in New York State. He reported his findings and observations in Sun Myung Moon and the Unification Church, published by Abingdon Press. The book also provides an overview of the Divine Principle.  In an interview with UPI Sontag compared the HSA-UWC with the Church of Jesus Christ of Latter-day Saints and said that he expected its practices to conform more to mainstream American society as its members become more mature. He added that he did not want to be considered an apologist but a close look at HSA-UWC's theology is important: "They raise some incredibly interesting issues."

In 1984 Eileen Barker published The Making of a Moonie based on her seven-year study of HSA-UWC members in the United Kingdom and the United States. In 2006 Laurence Iannaccone of George Mason University, a specialist in the economics of religion, wrote that The Making of a Moonie was "one of the most comprehensive and influential studies" of the process of conversion to new religious movements. Australian psychologist Len Oakes and British psychiatry professor Anthony Storr, who have written rather critically about cults, gurus, new religious movements, and their leaders have praised The Making of a Moonie. It was given the Distinguished Book Award for 1985 by the Society for the Scientific Study of Religion.  In 1997  Barker reported that Unificationists had mostly undergone a transformation in their world view from millennialism to utopianism.

In 1998 Irving Louis Horowitz, sociologist, questioned the relationship between the HSA-UWC and scholars whom it paid to conduct research on its behalf.

Theological disputes with Christianity

Fall of Man and view of Jesus

Central to Unification teachings is the concept that the Fall of Man was caused by the literal mating of Eve and Satan in the Garden of Eden, thus contaminating the whole human race with sin. According to the religion, humanity can only be restored to God through a messiah who comes as a new Adam: a new head of the human race, replacing the sinful parents, and siring new children free from Satanic influence. In the Unification Church, Jesus is this messiah, just as he is a messianic figure in more mainstream Christianity; however, since Jesus was prematurely killed before he could start a new sinless family, Sun Myung Moon claims he himself was called upon by God to fulfill Jesus' unresolved mission.

In 1980, Unification theologian Young Oon Kim wrote:

The Unification view of Jesus has been criticized by mainstream Christian authors and theologians. In their influential book The Kingdom of the Cults (first published in 1965), Walter Ralston Martin and Ravi K. Zacharias disagreed with the Divine Principle on the issues of the divinity of Christ, the virgin birth of Jesus, the Unification Church's belief that Jesus should have married and a literal resurrection of Jesus as well as a literal Second Coming. They add: "Moon makes all men equal in "divinity" to Jesus, thereby striking a blow at the uniqueness of Christ."

The Divine Principle states on this point:

Unificationist theologian Young Oon Kim wrote, and some members of the Unification movement believe, that Zechariah was the father of Jesus, based on the work of Leslie Weatherhead, an English Christian theologian in the liberal Protestant tradition.

Indemnity 

Indemnity, in the context of Unification theology, is a part of the process by which human beings and the world are restored to God's ideal. The concept of indemnity is explained at the start of the second half of the Divine Principle, "Introduction to Restoration":
 

The Divine Principle goes on to explain three types of indemnity conditions. Equal conditions of indemnity pay back the full value of what was lost. The biblical verse "life for life, eye for eye, tooth for tooth" (Exod.21:23–24) is quoted as an example of an equal indemnity condition. Lesser conditions of indemnity provide a benefit greater than the price that is paid. Faith, baptism, and the eucharist are mentioned as examples of lesser indemnity conditions. Greater conditions of indemnity come about when a person fails in a lesser condition. In that case a greater price must be paid to make up for the earlier failure. Abraham's attempted sacrifice of his son Isaac (Gen. 22:1–18) and the Israelites' 40 years of wandering in the wilderness under Moses (Num.14:34) are mentioned as examples of greater indemnity conditions. The Divine Principle then explains that an indemnity condition must reverse the course by which the mistake or loss came about. Indemnity, at its core, is required of humans because God is pure, and purity cannot relate directly with impurity. Indemnification is the vehicle that allows a "just and righteous" God to work through mankind. Jesus' statement that God had forsaken him (Matt.27:46) and Christianity's history of martyrdom are mentioned as examples of this. The Divine Principle then states that human beings, not God or the angels, are the ones responsible for making indemnity conditions.

In 2005 scholars Daske and Ashcraft explained the concept of indemnity:

Other Protestant Christian commentators have criticized the concept of indemnity as being contrary to the doctrine of sola fide. Christian historian Ruth Tucker said: "In simple language indemnity is salvation by works." Rev. Keiko Kawasaki wrote: “The indemnity condition (of the Unification Church) is an oriental way of thinking, meaning a condition for atonement for sins (unlike Christianity).” Donald Tingle and Richard Fordyce, ministers with the Christian Church (Disciples of Christ) who debated two Unification Church theologians in 1977, wrote: "In short, indemnity is anything you want to make it, since you establish the conditions. The zeal and enthusiasm of the Unification Church members is not so much based on love for God as it is compulsion to indemnify one's own sins."

Protestant commentators have criticized Unification Church teachings as being contrary to the Protestant doctrine of salvation by faith alone.  In their influential book The Kingdom of the Cults (first published in 1965), Walter Ralston Martin and Ravi K. Zacharias disagreed with the Divine Principle on the issues of Christology, the virgin birth of Jesus, the movement's belief that Jesus should have married, the necessity of the crucifixion of Jesus, and a literal resurrection of Jesus as well as a literal Second Coming.

Relations with other religions

Judaism 

Unificationism holds that the Jewish people as a whole were prepared by God to receive the Messiah in the person of Jesus of Nazareth, with John the Baptist tasked from birth with the mission to lead the Jewish people to Jesus, but failed in his mission. According to the Divine Principle, the Jews went through a "course of indemnity" due to the failure of John the Baptist to recognize Jesus as the Messiah, in spite of publicly testifying to him at the Jordan River, whilst receiving the baptism.

In 1976, the American Jewish Committee released a report by Rabbi A. James Rudin which stated that the Divine Principle contained "pejorative language, stereotyped imagery, and accusations of collective sin and guilt." In a news conference which was presented by the AJC and representatives of Catholic and Protestant churches, panelists stated that the text "contained over 125 anti-Jewish references." They also cited Moon's recent and public condemnation of "antisemitic and anti-Christian attitudes", and called upon him to make a "comprehensive and systematic removal" of antisemitic and anti-Christian references in the Divine Principle as a demonstration of good faith.

In 1977, the HSA-UWC issued a rebuttal to the report, stating that it was neither comprehensive nor reconciliatory, instead, it had a "hateful tone" and it was filled with "sweeping denunciations". It denied that the Divine Principle teaches antisemitism and gave detailed responses to 17 specific allegations which were contained in the AJC's report, stating that the allegations were distortions of teachings and obscurations of the real content of passages or the passages were accurate summaries of Jewish scriptures or New Testament passages.

In 1984, Mose Durst, then the president of the Unification Church of the United States as well as a convert from Judaism, said that the Jewish community had been "hateful" in its response to the growth of the Unification movement, and he also placed blame on the community's "insecurity" and Unification Church members' "youthful zeal and ignorance".  Rudin, then the national interreligious affairs director of the American Jewish Committee, said that Durst's remarks were inaccurate and unfair and he also said that "hateful is a harsh word to use".  In the same year Durst wrote in his autobiography: "Our relations with the Jewish community have been the most painful to me personally. I say this with a heavy heart, since I was raised in the Jewish faith and am proud of my heritage."

In 1989, Unification Church leaders Peter Ross and Andrew Wilson issued "Guidelines for Members of The Unification Church in Relations with the Jewish People" which stated: "In the past there have been serious misunderstandings between Judaism and the Unification Church. In order to clarify these difficulties and guide Unification Church members in their relations with Jews, the Unification Church suggests the following guidelines."

Christianity 

In 1974 Moon founded the Unification Theological Seminary, in Barrytown, New York, partly in order to improve relations of the movement with other churches.  Professors from other denominations, including a Methodist minister, a Presbyterian, and a Roman Catholic priest, as well as a rabbi, were hired to teach religious studies to the students, who were being trained as leaders in the movement.

In 1977, Unification member Jonathan Wells, who later became well known as the author of the popular Intelligent Design book Icons of Evolution, defended Unification theology against what he said were unfair criticisms by the National Council of Churches. That same year Frederick Sontag, a professor of philosophy at Pomona College and a minister in the United Church of Christ, published Sun Myung Moon and the Unification Church which gave an overview of the movement and urged Christians to take it more seriously.

In the 1980s the Unification Church sent thousands of American ministers from other churches on trips to Japan and South Korea to inform them about Unification teachings. At least one minister was dismissed by his congregation for taking part. In 1994 the church had about 5,000 members in Russia and came under criticism from the Russian Orthodox Church.  In 1997, the Russian government passed a law requiring the movement and other non-Russian religions to register their congregations and submit to tight controls.

In 1982, Moon was imprisoned in the United States after being found guilty by a jury of willfully filing false Federal income tax returns and conspiracy. (See: United States v. Sun Myung Moon)  HSA-UWC members launched a public-relations campaign. Booklets, letters and videotapes were mailed to approximately 300,000 Christian leaders in the United States. Many of them signed petitions protesting the government's case. The American Baptist Churches in the U.S.A, the National Council of Churches, the National Black Catholic Clergy Caucus, and the Southern Christian Leadership Conference filed briefs in support of Moon.

In 1995 the Unification Movement related organization the Women's Federation for World Peace indirectly contributed $3.5 million to help Baptist Liberty University which at that time was in financial difficulty. This was reported in the United States news media as an example of closer relationships between the movement and conservative Christian congregations.

Islam 

The Divine Principle lists the Muslim world as one of the world's four major divisions (the others being East Asia, Hindu, and Christendom). Unification movement support for Islamist anti-communists came to public attention in 1987 when church member Lee Shapiro was killed in Afghanistan during the Soviet–Afghan War while filming a documentary. The resistance group they were traveling with reported that they had been ambushed by military forces of the Soviet Union or the Afghan government. However, the details have been questioned, partly because of the poor reputation of the group's leader, Gulbuddin Hekmatyar.

In 1997, the Washington Report on Middle East Affairs (which is critical of United States and Israeli policies), praised the Unification Movement owned newspaper, The Washington Times  and the Times sister publication The Middle East Times (along with The Christian Science Monitor owned by the Church of Christ, Scientist) for their objective and informative coverage of Islam and the Middle East, while criticizing the Times generally pro-Israel editorial policy.  The Report suggested that these newspapers, being owned by religious organizations, were less influenced by pro-Israel pressure groups in the United States.

In 2000 the FFWPU co-sponsored the Million Family March, a rally in Washington D.C. to celebrate family unity and racial and religious harmony, along with the Nation of Islam. Louis Farrakhan, the leader of The Nation of Islam, was the main speaker at the event which was held on 16 October 2000; the fifth anniversary of the Million Man March, which was also organized by Farrakhan. Unification Church leader Dan Fefferman wrote to his colleagues acknowledging that Farrakhan's and Moon's views differed on multiple issues but shared a view of a "God-centered family".  In 2007 Rev and Mrs Moon sent greetings to Farrakhan while he was recovering from cancer, saying: "We send love and greetings to Minister Farrakhan and Mother Khadijah."

In the 1990s and 2000s the Unification Movement made public statements claiming communications with the spirits of religious leaders including Muhammad and also Confucius, the Buddha, Jesus, and Augustine, as well as political leaders such as Karl Marx, Friedrich Engels, Lenin, Joseph Stalin, Leon Trotsky, Mao Zedong and many more. This was reported to have distanced the movement from Islam as well as from mainstream Christianity.  From 2001 to 2009 the Unification movement owned the American Life TV Network (now known as Youtoo TV), which in 2007 broadcast George Clooney's documentary, A Journey to Darfur, which was harshly critical of Islamists in Darfur, the Republic of Sudan. It released the film on DVD in 2008 and announced that proceeds from its sale would be donated to the International Rescue Committee. In his 2009 autobiography Moon praised Islam and expressed the hope that there would be more understanding between different religious communities. In 2011, representatives of the Unification Church took part in an international seminar which was held in Taiwan by the Muslim World League.  The said purpose of the seminar was to encourage inter-faith dialogue and discourage people from resorting to terrorism.

Interfaith activities 

In 2009 the FFWPU held an interfaith event in the Congress of the Republic of Peru. Former President of the Congress Marcial Ayaipoma and other notable politicians were called "Ambassadors for Peace" of the Unification Church.  In 2010, the church built a large interfaith temple in Seoul. Author Deepak Chopra was the keynote at an interfaith event of the Unification Church co-hosted with the United Nations at the Headquarters of the United Nations.  In 2011, an interfaith event was held in the National Assembly of Thailand, the President of the National Assembly of Thailand attended the event.  In 2012, the Unification movement affiliated-Universal Peace Federation held an interfaith dialogue in Italy that was cosponsored by United Nations. That year, the Universal Peace Federation held an interfaith program for representatives of 12 various religions and confessions in the hall of the United Nations General Assembly. The President of the United Nations General Assembly, the Deputy Secretary-General of the United Nations, the Permanent Observer of the Holy See to the United Nations and other UN officials spoke.

Science 

The Divine Principle calls for the unification of science and religion: "Religion and science, each in their own spheres, have been the methods of searching for truth in order to conquer ignorance and attain knowledge. Eventually, the way of religion and the way of science should be integrated and their problems resolved in one united undertaking; the two aspects of truth, internal and external, should develop in full consonance."

In the 1970s and 1980s the Unification Movement sponsored the International Conference on the Unity of the Sciences (ICUS), in order to promote the concept of the unity of science and religion. American news media have suggested that the conferences were also an attempt to improve the often controversial public image of the church.  The first conference, held in 1972,  had 20 participants; while the largest conference, in Seoul, South Korea in 1982, had 808 participants from over 100 countries. Participants in one or more of the conferences included Nobel laureates John Eccles (Physiology or Medicine 1963, who chaired the 1976 conference) and Eugene Wigner (Physics 1963).

The relationship of the Unification Movement and science again came to public attention in 2002 with the publication of Icons of Evolution, a popular book critical of the teaching of evolution written by member Jonathan Wells.  Wells is a graduate of the Unification Theological Seminary and has been active with the Discovery Institute as an advocate for intelligent design.

Political activism

Anti-communism 

In the 1940s, Moon cooperated with Communist Party members in support of the Korean independence movement against Imperial Japan. After the Korean War (1950–1953), he became an outspoken anti-communist. Moon viewed the Cold War  between liberal democracy and communism as the final conflict between God and Satan, with divided Korea as its primary front line. Soon after its founding, the Unification movement began supporting anti-communist organizations, including the World League for Freedom and Democracy founded in 1966 in Taipei, Republic of China (Taiwan), by Chiang Kai-shek,  and the Korean Culture and Freedom Foundation, an international public diplomacy organization which also sponsored Radio Free Asia.  The Unification movement was criticized for its anti-communist activism by the mainstream media and the alternative press, and many members of them said that it could lead to World War Three and a nuclear holocaust. The movement's anti-communist activities received financial support from Japanese millionaire and activist Ryōichi Sasakawa.

In 1972, Moon predicted the decline of communism, based on the teachings of the Divine Principle: "After 7,000 biblical years—6,000 years of restoration history plus the millennium, the time of completion—communism will fall in its 70th year. Here is the meaning of the year 1978. Communism, begun in 1917, could maintain itself approximately 60 years and reach its peak. So 1978 is the border line and afterward communism will decline; in the 70th year it will be altogether ruined. This is true. Therefore, now is the time for people who are studying communism to abandon it." In 1973, he called for an "automatic theocracy" to replace communism and solve "every political and economic situation in every field".  In 1975, Moon spoke at a government sponsored rally against potential North Korean military aggression on Yeouido Island in Seoul to an audience of around 1 million.

In 1976, Moon established News World Communications, an international news media conglomerate which publishes The Washington Times newspaper in Washington, D.C., and newspapers in South Korea, Japan, and South America, partly in order to promote political conservatism. According to The Washington Post, "the Times was established by Moon to combat communism and be a conservative alternative to what he perceived as the liberal bias of The Washington Post." Bo Hi Pak, called Moon's "right-hand man", was the founding president and the founding chairman of the board. Moon asked Richard L. Rubenstein, a rabbi and college professor, to join its board of directors. The Washington Times has often been noted for its generally pro-Israel editorial policies. In 2002, during the 20th anniversary party for the Times, Moon said: "The Washington Times will become the instrument in spreading the truth about God to the world."

In 1980, members founded CAUSA International, an anti-communist educational organization based in New York City. In the 1980s, it was active in 21 countries. In the United States, it sponsored educational conferences for evangelical and fundamentalist Christian leaders as well as seminars and conferences for Senate staffers, Hispanic Americans and conservative activists. In 1986, CAUSA International sponsored the documentary film Nicaragua Was Our Home, about the Miskito Indians of Nicaragua and their persecution at the hands of the Nicaraguan government. It was filmed and produced by USA-UWC member Lee Shapiro, who later died while filming with anti-Soviet forces during the Soviet–Afghan War. At this time CAUSA international also directly assisted the United States Central Intelligence Agency in supplying the Contras, in addition to paying for flights by rebel leaders. CAUSA's aid to the Contras escalated after Congress cut off CIA funding for them.

In 1980, members in Washington, D.C., disrupted a protest rally against the United States military draft. In 1981, the Appellate Division of New York State Supreme Court ruled that the HSA–UWC was not entitled to property tax exemptions on its New York City properties since its primary purpose was political, not religious. In 1982, this ruling was overturned by the New York State Supreme Court itself, which ruled that it should be considered a religious organization for tax purposes.

In 1983, some American members joined a public protest against the Soviet Union in response to its shooting down of Korean Airlines Flight 007. In 1984, the HSA–UWC founded the Washington Institute for Values in Public Policy, a Washington, D.C. think tank that underwrites conservative-oriented research and seminars at Stanford University, the University of Chicago, and other institutions. In the same year, member Dan Fefferman founded the International Coalition for Religious Freedom in Virginia, which is active in protesting what it considers to be threats to religious freedom by governmental agencies. In August 1985, the Professors World Peace Academy, an organization founded by Moon, sponsored a conference in Geneva to debate the theme "The situation in the world after the fall of the communist empire."  After the dissolution of the Soviet Union in 1991 the Unification movement promoted extensive missionary work in Russia and other former Soviet nations.

Korean unification 

In 1991, Moon met with Kim Il-sung, the North Korean President, to discuss ways to achieve peace on the Korean Peninsula, as well as on international relations, tourism, and other topics.  In 1992, Kim gave his first and only interview with the Western news media to Washington Times reporter Josette Sheeran, who later became executive director of the United Nations World Food Programme. In 1994, Moon was officially invited to Kim's funeral, in spite of the absence of diplomatic relations between North Korea and South Korea.

In 1998, Unification movement-related businesses launched operations in North Korea with the approval of the government of South Korea, which had prohibited business relationships between North and South before. In 2000, the church-associated business group Tongil Group founded Pyeonghwa Motors in the North Korean port of Nampo, in cooperation with the North Korean government. It was the first automobile factory in North Korea.

During the presidency of George W. Bush, Dong Moon Joo, a Unification movement member and then president of The Washington Times, undertook unofficial diplomatic missions to North Korea in an effort to improve its relationship with the United States. Joo was born in North Korea and is a citizen of the United States.

In 2003, Korean Unification Movement members started a political party in South Korea. It was named The Party for God, Peace, Unification and Home. In its inauguration declaration, the new party said it would focus on preparing for Korean reunification by educating the public about God and peace. Moon was a member of the Honorary Committee of the Unification Ministry of the Republic of Korea. Church member Jae-jung Lee was a Unification Minister of the Republic of Korea.

In 2010, in Pyongyang, to mark the 20th anniversary of Moon's visit to Kim Il-sung, de jure head of state Kim Yong-nam hosted Moon's son Hyung Jin Moon, then the president of the Unification Church, in his official residence. At that time, Hyung Jin Moon donated 600 tons of flour to the children of Jeongju, the birthplace of Sun Myung Moon.

In 2012, Moon was posthumously awarded North Korea's National Reunification Prize. On the first anniversary of Moon's death, North Korean chairman Kim Jong-un expressed condolences to Han and the family, saying: "Kim Jong-un prayed for the repose of Moon, who worked hard for national concord, prosperity and reunification and world peace." In 2017, the Unification Church sponsored the International Association of Parliamentarians for Peace (IAPP)—headed by former Prime Minister of Nepal Madhav Kumar Nepal and former Minister of Peace and Reconstruction Ek Nath Dhakal—visited Pyongyang and had constructive talks with the Korean Workers' Party. In 2020 the movement held an in-person and virtual rally for Korean unification which drew about one million attendees.

Controversy

Criticisms of Moon 

Moon's claim to be the Messiah and the Second Coming of Christ has been rejected by both Jewish and Christian scholars. Protestant commentators have criticized Moon's teachings as being contrary to the Protestant doctrine of salvation by faith alone. In their influential book The Kingdom of the Cults (first published in 1965), Walter Ralston Martin and Ravi K. Zacharias disagreed with the Divine Principle on the issues of the divinity of Christ, the virgin birth of Jesus, Moon's belief that Jesus should have married, the necessity of the crucifixion of Jesus, a literal resurrection of Jesus, as well as a literal second coming of Jesus. Commentators have criticized the Divine Principle for saying that the First World War, the Second World War, the Holocaust, and the Cold War served as indemnity conditions to prepare the world for the establishment of the Kingdom of God.

In 1998, journalist Peter Maass, writing for The New Yorker, reported that some Unification members complained about Blessing being given to non-members who had not gone through the same course that members had.  In 2000, Moon was criticized, including by some members of his church, for his support of Nation of Islam leader Louis Farrakhan's Million Family March. Moon was also criticized for his relationship with Jewish scholar Richard L. Rubenstein, an advocate of the "death of God theology" of the 1960s. Rubenstein was a defender of the Unification Church and served on its advisory council, as well as on the board of directors of the church-owned Washington Times newspaper. In the 1990s, he served as president of the University of Bridgeport, which was then affiliated with the church.

In 1998, the Egyptian newspaper Al-Ahram criticized Moon's possible relationship with Israeli Prime Minister Benjamin Netanyahu and wrote that the Washington Times editorial policy was "rabidly anti-Arab, anti-Muslim and pro-Israel."  Moon has also been criticized for his advocacy of a world-wide "automatic theocracy", as well as for advising his followers that they should become "crazy for God".

Investigation by the United States House of Representatives

In 1977, the Subcommittee on International Organizations of the Committee on International Relations, of the United States House of Representatives, reported that the Unification Church was established by the director of the Korean Central Intelligence Agency (KCIA), Kim Chong Pil. The committee also reported that the KCIA had used the movement to gain political influence with the United States and some of its members had worked as volunteers in Congressional offices. Together they founded the Korean Cultural Freedom Foundation, a nonprofit organization which acted as a public diplomacy campaign for the Republic of Korea. The committee also investigated possible KCIA influence on the Unification Church's campaign in support of Nixon.

Defamation lawsuit against the Daily Mail

In 1978, the Daily Mail, a British tabloid newspaper, published an article with the headline: "The Church That Breaks Up Families". The article accused the Unification Church of brainwashing and separating families. The British Unification Church's director Dennis Orme filed a libel suit against the Daily Mail and Associated Newspapers, its parent company, resulting in one of the longest civil actions in British legal historylasting six months. Orme and the Unification Church lost the libel case, the appeal case, and were refused permission to take their case to the House of Lords. The original case heard 117 witnesses, including American anti-cult psychiatrist Margaret Thaler Singer. In the original case, the Unification Church was ordered to pay Associated Newspapers GB£750,000 in costs which was maintained after appeal. The jury of the original case not only awarded Associated Newspapers costs, but it and the judge requested that the Attorney General re-examine the Unification Church's charitable status, which after a lengthy investigation from 1986 to 1988 was not removed. According to George Chryssides, about half of the Unification Church's 500 full-time membership in Britain moved to the United States. The Unification Church sold seven of its twelve principal church centers after the ruling. Other anti-cultists in countries like Germany sought to incorporate the London High Court's decision into law. The Unification Church has won other libel and defamation cases in the United Kingdom, including a similar case against The Daily Telegraph.

United States v. Sun Myung Moon

In 1982, Moon was imprisoned in the United States after being found guilty by a jury of willfully filing false Federal income tax returns and conspiracy. (See: United States v. Sun Myung Moon)  HSA-UWC members launched a public-relations campaign. Booklets, letters and videotapes were mailed to approximately 300,000 Christian leaders in the United States. Many of them signed petitions protesting the government's case. The American Baptist Churches in the U.S.A, the National Council of Churches, the National Black Catholic Clergy Caucus, and the Southern Christian Leadership Conference filed briefs in support of Moon.
In 1982, Moon was convicted in the United States of filing false federal income tax returns and conspiracy: see United States v. Sun Myung Moon. He served 13 months of the sentence at the Federal Correctional Institution, Danbury in Danbury, Connecticut. The case was protested as a case of selective prosecution and a threat to religious freedom by, among others, Jerry Falwell, head of Moral Majority, Joseph Lowery, head of the Southern Christian Leadership Conference, Harvey Cox a professor of Divinity at Harvard, and Eugene McCarthy, United States Senator and former Democratic Party presidential candidate.

Crown of Peace event in Washington DC

On March 23, 2004, at a ceremony in the Dirksen Senate Office Building, in Washington, D.C., Moon crowned himself with what was called the "Crown of Peace". Lawmakers who attended included Senator Mark Dayton (D-Minn.), Representatives Roscoe Bartlett (R-Md.) and Elijah Cummings (D-Md.), as well as former Representative Walter Fauntroy (D-D.C.). Key organizers of the event included George Augustus Stallings Jr., a former Roman Catholic priest who had been married by Moon, and Michael Jenkins, the president of the Unification Church of the United States at that time. Rep. Danny K. Davis (D-Ill.) played an active role in the ceremony. The New York Times, in 2008, suggested that the participation of federal elected officials in this event was a possible violation of the principle of separation of church and state in United States law.

Spiritual sales

Before the enactment of laws restricting spiritual sales 
Historically, Japan has provided 70% of the Unification Church's income. The church gets funding from "spiritual sales." This involves parishioners scanning obituaries, going door-to-door, and saying, "Your dead loved one is communicating with us, so please go to the bank and send money to the Unification Church so your loved one can ascend to heaven in the spirit world". The Unification Church and its leaders have been accused by critics of "exploiting the labor and capital of their followers, including billions of dollars transferred from Japan to the United States, to build a business empire". Tak Ji-il, a professor at Busan Presbyterian University, said the Unification Church is fighting over religious principles on the surface but money in reality.

Some of the additional criticisms of the Japanese Unification Church are that it conceals its name to entice people to become followers and that it forces followers to marry partners it has chosen for them. In 1984 Yoshikazu Soejima, a senior official of the Unification Church, revealed inside information about the church in the monthly magazine Bungei Shunjū released on June 10, 1984. According to Soejima, in the 1970s about 200 billion yen in donations from Japanese believers were sent to South Korea. Also about 800 million dollars were transferred from Japan to the United States in the nine years from 1975 to 1984. Soejima was stabbed several times in front of his house on June 2, just before the magazine was released, He almost died. The police could not identify his attacker.

In 1987, about 300 lawyers in Japan set up an association called the National Network of Lawyers Against Spiritual Sales  to help people who were forced to make expensive donations or forced to buy expensive things like pots and seals. According to statistics compiled by the association's lawyers between 1987 and 2021, the association and local government consumer centers received 34,537 complaints alleging that the Unification Church had forced them to make large donations, amounting to about 123.7 billion yen.  The network reported that victims were cheated out of about 300 million yen in 2021. Hiroshi Yamaguchi, a lawyer working for the network said, "The Unification Church should consider the pain and tragedy of the families of its followers. The Unification Church has bankrupted many of its followers". Another lawyer, Yasuo Kawai, accused Japanese politicians and administrators of taking no action against the Unification Church, which he said disintegrates families, for more than 30 years. Kito Masaki called for Japan's National Diet (parliament) to conduct a bipartisan investigation of the case.

In civil cases, Japanese courts have issued a number of rulings ordering the Unification Church to pay compensation to the plaintiffs, saying its missionary work is illegal. Criminal cases related to the Unification Church have also occurred. In 2009, the Tokyo District Court sentenced Unification Church members to prison for forcing victims to buy expensive seals. The court ruled that the missionary work was a pernicious act of forcing its victims to buy a seal immediately after instigating their anxiety by linking their worries to their long-time ancestral pasts.

According to the Japanese Communist Party newspaper Akahata, for the Unification Church, Japan has a history of aggression against Korea, therefore has an obligation to serve Korea, and as atonement, internally known as "indemnity", collection of money by "Fortune telling fraud"（霊感商法） is imposed. Moon's theology is that Korea is the Adam country, the home of the ruling race destined to rule the world, and Japan is the Eve country, subordinate to Korea. The church preached that Moon was appointed to save humanity after Eve fell from grace by having sexual relations with Satan. According to Yoshifu Arita, a former journalist and member of the House of Councillors who is investigating the Unification Church, it is taking advantage of Japanese young people's sense of guilt for Japan's 40-year colonial rule of Korea (1905–1945) and defrauding them of money.

Legislation to restrict donations to religious organizations and provide relief to victims 
On 9 December 2022, Taro Kono, Minister of State for Consumer Affairs and Food Safety, who will have jurisdiction over the law, stated that he personally recognizes the Unification Church as a "cult".

On 10 December 2022, the House of Representatives of Japan and the House of Councillors passed two bills to restrict the activities of religious organizations such as theUnification Churchand provide relief to victims. These bills were designed to address social problems caused by the Unification Church, and the political parties and the press saw these bills as a way to restrict "cults" in the process leading up to the legislation.

The new law stipulates prohibited acts and duty of care for juridical persons, including religious organizations, when soliciting donations. Prohibited acts include the following: a juridical persons must not induce the donor to borrow money or sell his/her home or fields in order to raise the funds for the donation, a juridical person must not accompany the donor to a place from which the donor is unable to leave, and a juridical person must not prevent the donor from consulting with someone. The duty of care is that the juridical person shall not suppress the free will of the soliciting subject and that the solicitation shall not make life difficult for the soliciting subject's family. If a juridical person commits a prohibited act, a correction order is issued, and a person who repeatedly violates the order is subject to imprisonment for up to one year and a fine of up to 1 million yen. If a juridical person violates its duty of care, the name of the juridical person will be made public. It was also stipulated that contracts for donations or sales of goods through "spiritual sales" (reikan shōhō, 霊感商法) can be revoked up to 10 years after the contract is concluded and up to three years after the target of the solicitation becomes aware of the damage. In addition, it is also stipulated that donations contracted while the target of the solicitation is under brainwashing can be canceled. The law also stipulates that the victim's family can also revoke the donation due to improper solicitation, and that the victim or his or her family can claim from the juridical person the amount of past damages as well as living expenses and child support that the child or spouse is entitled to in the future. The new law then defines spiritual sales, in which a contract can be rescinded, as soliciting donations or selling goods after taking advantage of the anxiety of the target of the solicitation or causing the target of the solicitation to become anxious.

These bills were supported by the ruling Liberal Democratic Party and Komeito, and opposition parties the Constitutional Democratic Party of Japan (CDP), Nippon Ishin no Kai, and Democratic Party for the People, and opposed by the opposition parties the Japanese Communist Party (JCP) and the Reiwa Shinsengumi. The CDP had opposed the bills, seeking legislation to more strictly restrict religious organizations, but switched to support it after a clause to review the law two years later was specified in the bill. According to the CDP and some Unification Church victims, legislation to restrict religious organizations even more strictly is needed. The JCP had proposed another bill to restrict religious organizations and therefore opposed the bills.

Support for North Korea's development of nuclear weapons

According to Defense Intelligence Agency reports in August and September 1994, Moon donated 450 billion yen to Kim Il-sung during his stay in North Korea from November 30, 1991, to December 7, 1992. Most of the money was said to have been donated to the Unification Church by Japanese believers. According to the former chief executive of Pyeonghwa Motors, a Unification Church auto company, the money collected from Japanese devotees was first transferred to South Korea and money laundered, then transferred to Hong Kong and finally to North Korea. He said he had a close relationship with Ju Kyu-chang, a senior member of the Workers' Party of Korea and its weapons development chief. According to Baek Seung-joo, a former South Korean vice defense minister, has analyzed that money donated by Japanese followers of theUnification Churchwas diverted to North Korea's nuclear development and development of intercontinental ballistic missiles. According to Masuo Oe, who was the public relations director of the Unification Church, when Moon said to Kim Il-sung in a meeting, "Please be my brother", Kim Il-sung replied, "Sure, why not?". According to him, believers heard this anecdote and admired that the Messiah had brought Satan to his knees with the power of love. This was a symbolic event that marked a major shift in the anti-communist policies of the Unification Church.

According to a 2016 South Korean Defense Ministry parliamentary report, a Tokyo-run company operated by members of theUnification Churchsold a Russian Golf II-class submarine still loaded with missile launchers to North Korea in 1994, disguised as scrap metal, and the technology was then diverted to North Korea's development of submarine-launched ballistic missiles.

Renaming (Japan)
Since 1997, the Japanese  Unification Church had repeatedly applied to the Agency for Cultural Affairs (ACA), a department directly under the Ministry of Education, Culture, Sports, Science and Technology, for changing its name from "The Holy Spirit Association for the Unification of World Christianity" (世界基督教統一神霊協会) to "Heavenly Parent's Holy Community Family Federation for World Peace and Unification" (天の父母様聖会世界平和統一家庭連合). According to the then chief of the Religious Affairs Division, the application was rejected by the ACA. When in 2015, Hakubun Shimomura was appointed as the Minister of Education, Culture, Sports, Science and Technology under the Third Abe Cabinet, the Unification Church applied for rename again and it was finally approved. Shimomura denied any involvement in the approval process, excusing the final decision was made by the head of the ACA, but Shimomura admitted that he received report about the application of rename, the 2015 head of the ACA also echoed Shimomura's explanation.

Assassination of Shinzo Abe 

The Unification Church has historically had a close relationship with the conservative Liberal Democratic Party, which Nobusuke Kishi founded, and which later had been led by his grandson, then Japanese prime minister Shinzo Abe. In 2019, National Network of Lawyers Against Spiritual Sales released a document protesting Abe sending congratulatory messages to events organized by theUnification Churchand its affiliated organizations. The association feared that Abe's message would give authority to the Unification Church and encourage its "anti-social activities".

In 2022, Abe was assassinated by Tetsuya Yamagami, who stated that he resented the Unification Church because his mother was "forced" to make a large donation to it. She joined the Unification Church in 1998, and sold the land she inherited from her father along with the house where she lived with her 3 children. In June 1999, she donated about 100 million yen (US$720,000) to the UC, leading to her family's bankruptcy in 2002 and significantly affecting their family, according to Yamagami. Financially troubled, Yamagami was unable to enter university despite graduating from a prestigious high school. His brother and his father would later commit suicide. Yamagami stated that his original plan was to assassinate Hak Ja Han, the widow of Sun Myung Moon and the current leader of the UC. However, he gave up his plan because he could not get close to her. He believes Abe and his grandfather, Nobusuke Kishi, spread theUnification Churchin Japan and decided to kill Abe after discovering online that Abe had sent video messages to UC-related organizations.

Unification Church spokesperson Tomihiro Tanaka stated in a press conference that in the past it had had problems with its followers due to illegal solicitations and large donations. He claimed that there has been no trouble between the Unification Church and its followers since 2009, when it began to emphasize legal compliance.  On 11 July 2022 the Unification Church issued a press release stating donation amounts are determined by individual members.  Chung Hwan Kwak, the Honorary President of the Global Peace Foundation, who had long held a position second to Sun Myung Moon in the Unification Church and left it in 2009 after internal strife, apologized on behalf of the Unification Church. He said that the church was responsible for the assassination of Abe. According to Kwak, a wave of bankruptcies, divorces and suicides among Japanese believers had prompted him to attempt to normalize Japan's status as an "economic force" in 2001, but his attempt was thwarted by strong opposition from other church leaders. The Unification Church later denied Kwak's claim, saying that it was Kwak who called for the transfer of Japanese money to the church headquarters.

The National Public Safety Commission chair Satoshi Ninoyu instructed police authorities to set up a panel to investigate the security lapses which may have been involved in Abe's death. The Commission chair was among several elected officials who promoted a Unification Church event in 2021. Japan's main opposition party, the Constitutional Democratic Party of Japan, and two other opposition parties, the Democratic Party for the People and the Japanese Communist Party, have said that they plan to launch their own investigations into the Unification Church's political influence and connections in Japanese politics. On August 31, 2022, the ruling Liberal Democratic Party (LDP), of which Abe was a member, announced that it would no longer have any relationships with the Unification Church and its related organizations. The Liberal Democratic Party has announced that it will expel its members if they do not break any ongoing relationships with the Unification Church. Fumio Kishida, Japan's prime minister and president of the LDP, stated in October 2022 that the Japanese government would start an investigation into the extent of Abe's relationship with the Unification Church.

Esotericism 
The Unification Church is sometimes said to be esoteric in that it keeps some of its doctrines secret from non-members, a practice that is sometimes called "heavenly deception". In 1979, critics D. Tingle and R. Fordyce commented: "How different the openness of Christianity is to the attitude of Reverend Moon and his followers who are often reluctant to reveal to the public many of their basic doctrines." Since the 1990s, many Unification texts that were formerly regarded as esoteric have been posted on the Family Federation for World Peace and Unification's official websites.

Child adoption
The Unification Church  came under investigation by Japan's Ministry of Health, Labour and Welfare for allegations about organizing children being transferred between members' families without authorization from the prefectural government. The authorization requirement came into effect in 2018 and if convicted of violation the offender would face imprisonment or a fine. The church reported that there were 31 known adoptions between 2018 and 2022, when questioned by the welfare ministry. The church denies the allegation that they act as an agent in the arrangement, but says that the child adoptions happen between families privately.

According to media reports, the reason for children being adopted by a different family is not that their biological parents lack the ability to raise them, but because of the teaching of the Unification Church "to allow the blessed but childless families to inherit their beautiful tradition." This is perceived as a violation of a child's right to be raised by their biological parents as much as possible, as stipulated in the United Nations Convention on the Rights of the Child.  Japan is a party to this treaty. The ministry requested that the church revise their teachings about children to comply with Japan's child welfare laws. Some adoptees complained to the ministry and media that they are emotionally traumatized after learning their adoptions were religiously motivated. On February 1, 2023, the Unification Church of Japan revised their believers' handbook to remove references to child adoption.

The Ministry of Health, Labour and Welfare submitted several questionnaires about the child adoption practice to the Unification Church between November and December 2022, but in the second inquiry the Unification Church refused to answer more than half of the questions, and sent a letter of protest to the ministry.

Related organizations 

Although Moon was commonly known as a religious figure, commentators have mentioned his belief in a literal Kingdom of God on earth to be brought about by human effort as a motivation for his establishment of multitudinous groups that are not strictly religious in their purposes. Moon was not directly involved with managing the day-to-day activities of the numerous organizations that he indirectly oversaw, yet all of them attribute the inspiration behind their work to his leadership and teachings. Others have said that one purpose of these non-sectarian organizations is to pursue social respectability. These organizations have sometimes been labelled "front groups", an expression which originally referred to Soviet supported organizations during the Cold War.

Multi-faceted organizations

Collegiate Association for the Research of Principles (CARP) 

The Collegiate Association for the Research of Principles (대학원리연구회,CARP) is a collegiate organization founded by Moon and his followers in 1955. According to the group's website, its goal is to promote "intercultural, interracial, and international cooperation through the Unification world view".  J. Isamu Yamamoto states in Unification Church: "At times CARP has been very subtle about its association with the Unification Church, however, the link between the two has always been strong, since the purpose of both is to spread Moon's teachings."

Universal Peace Federation (UPF) 

Universal Peace Federation (천주평화연합,UPF) is an international and interreligious civil society organization that was founded in 2005 which promotes religious freedom. UPF is a 501(c)(3) non-profit NGO in general consultative status with the United Nations Economic and Social Council (ECOSOC). Dialogue and Alliance is its journal published from Tarrytown, New York. UPF actively supports United Nations projects, especially in the field of peace education, family and peace building.

Women's Federation for World Peace (WFWP) 

The Women's Federation for World Peace(세계평화여성연합,WFWP) was founded in 1992 by Hak Ja Han.  Its stated purpose is to encourage women to work more actively in promoting peace in their communities and greater society. It has members in 143 countries.

Han has travelled the world speaking at conventions on the WFWP's behalf.  In 1993 the WFWP held a conference in Tokyo, Japan, at which the keynote speaker was former U.S. Vice President Dan Quayle's wife Marilyn Tucker Quayle, and in a speech at the event Han spoke positively of Mrs. Quayle's humanitarian work.

In 1993 Han travelled to 20 cities in the United States promoting the WFWP, as well as to 12 countries. At an event in Salt Lake City, Utah, she told attendants: "If a family is not centered on God's ideal of love, there will be conflict among the members of that family. Without God's love as an absolute center, such a family will ultimately break down. A nation of such families will also decline." Her 1993 speeches in the United States focused on increasing violence in the U.S., and the degradation of the family unit.

In 1995, the WFWP contributed $3.5 million to help Liberty University, which at that time was in financial difficulty. This was reported in the United States news media as an example of closer relationships between the Unification movement and conservative Christian congregations.  That same year former United States president George H. W. Bush spoke at several WFWP meetings in Japan,  and at a related conference in Washington, D.C. There he was quoted by The New York Times as saying: "If as president I could have done one thing to have helped the country more it would have been to do a better job in finding a way, either through speaking out or through raising a moral standard, to strengthen the American family."

The events in Japan drew protests from Japanese people who were wary of unorthodox religious groups. Bush's spokesperson Jane Becker stated "We were satisfied that there was not a connection with the Unification Church, and based on the information we were given we felt comfortable speaking to this group."  50,000 people attended Bush's speech in Tokyo. The theme of the talks was "family values". In the half-hour speech, Bush said "what really counts is faith, family and friends". Bush also spoke on the importance of the relationship between Japan and the United States and its importance for world peace. Han spoke after Bush's speech and praised Moon, crediting him for the decline of communism and saying that he must save America from "the destruction of the family and moral decay".

In 1999 the WFWP sponsored a conference in Malaysia in which religious and government leaders spoke on the need to strengthen education and support families, as well as the need for peace and understanding between ethnic and racial groups in the nations.  In 2009 it co-sponsored, along with the Unification movement affiliated organization the Universal Peace Federation and the government of Taiwan, a conference in Taipei calling for Taiwan's greater participation in world affairs independent of the People's Republic of China.  Taiwan's president, Ma Ying-jeou, spoke at the event.  The WFWP has also been active in sponsoring various local charity and community events.

Service For Peace (SFP) 

Service For Peace (서비스포피스,SFP) is a non-profit organization, founded in 2001 by the Sun Myung Moon's third son, Hyun Jin Preston Moon, to give opportunities to young people who wish to better themselves and their communities. As of April 2007, the organization had established chapters in North America, Central America, Caribbean, Europe, Asia, Africa and Oceania. SFP is active in communities and statewide. Colleges have recruited Service for Peace Campus Corps to benefit their fellow peers as well as the communities around them.  Some SFP chapters have smaller initiatives designed to meet local needs. In the US, Service For Peace's Backpack Angel program supports students throughout Kentucky by providing backpacks and school supplies for children in need.

International Conference on the Unity of the Sciences (ICUS) 

International Conference on the Unity of the Sciences (ICUS) is a series of conferences formerly sponsored by the International Cultural Foundation and since 2017 by the Hyo Jeong International Foundation on the Unity of the Sciences (HJIFUS). The first conference, held in 1972,  had 20 participants; while the largest conference, in Seoul, South Korea in 1982, had 808 participants from over 100 countries.

Participants in one or more of the conferences included Nobel laureates John Eccles (Physiology or Medicine 1963, who chaired the 1976 conference), Eugene Wigner (Physics 1963), economist and political philosopher Friedrich Hayek, ecologist Kenneth Mellanby, Frederick Seitz, pioneer of solid state physics, Ninian Smart, President of the American Academy of Religion, and Holocaust theologian Richard Rubenstein.

Moon believed that religion alone can not save the world, and his particular belief in the importance of the unity of science and religion was reportedly a motivation for the founding of the ICUS. American news media have suggested that the conferences were also an attempt to improve the often controversial Unification movement's public image.

The last two editions of the conference have focused on environmental issues, such as rising sea levels and water temperatures, food scarcity, renewable energy, and waste management. The theme in 2017, at ICUS XXIII, was "Earth's Environmental Crisis and the Role of Science", with a similar theme following at ICUS XXIV, in 2018: "Scientific Solutions to the Earth's Environmental Challenges". At ICUS XXV in 2019, the theme was "Environmental Health and the Quality of Human Life."

InterFaith organizations 

 The Assembly of the World's Religions was founded by Sun Myung Moon. The first assembly was held from November 15 to 21, 1985, in MacAfee, New Jersey. The second was from August 15 to 21, 1990 in San Francisco.
 Interreligious Federation for World Peace
 American Clergy Leadership Conference (ACLC)
 The Middle East Peace Initiative sponsors projects to promote peace and understanding including visits by international Christians to Israel and Palestine and dialogues between members of the Israeli Knesset and the Palestinian Legislative Council.
 The Interreligious Association for Peace and Development (IAPD) is an interfaith association that represents different religious traditions from around the world. It was launched in November 2017 in South Korea. The IAPD supports the efforts of the United Nations to achieve sustainable development and emphasizes the importance of religious freedom in society, and promotes interreligious cooperation, in accordance with publicly published information on the organization's official website.  Eminent Hindu leader Sadguru Bhau Maharaj ji supported the founding conference of the Interreligious Association for Peace and Development in India.  On August 14, 2021, the UPF initiated the establishment of the Interreligious Association for Peace and Development in Ghana, with the aim of promoting peace in the world through interfaith dialogue and cooperation. IAPD National Branches have so far been launched in Benin, DR Congo, Côte d'Ivoire, Kenya, Mali, Nigeria and Zambia.  The inauguration of the Interreligious Association for Peace and Development for Europe and the Middle East was held in April 2018 in Vienna, Austria.  The ambassador of the Republic of Korea in Austria spoke at the inauguration, as did Dr. Unger, one of the founders of the European Academy of Sciences and Arts. Speakers also included the Apostolic Archbishop of Zimbabwe, the President of the World Congress of Religions from the United Kingdom and other religious leaders.  In 2021, IAPD was also established in Malaysia. At the UPF summit in Korea in August 2022, a resolution was adopted to launch the IAPD Advisory Council in partnership with the African Union. During the celebration of the World Week of Interfaith Harmony in Georgia, a local branch of the Interreligious Association for Peace and Development was established in February 2022.

Educational organizations

 Cheongshim Graduate School of Theology
 CheongShim International Academy
 International Educational Foundation.
 New World Encyclopedia – an Internet encyclopedia that, in part, selects and claims to rewrite certain Wikipedia articles through a focus on Unification values. It "aims to organize and present human knowledge in ways consistent with our natural purposes" and "to promote knowledge that leads to happiness, well-being, and world peace".
 Paragon House, book publishing.
 The Professors World Peace Academy was founded in 1973 by Sun Myung Moon, who declared the group's intent to "contribute to the solutions of urgent problems facing our modern civilization and to help resolve the cultural divide between East and West". PWPA now has chapters in over one hundred countries.
 The International Association of Academicians for Peace (IAAP) was founded and operates as one of the peace associations of the UPF. At the February 2022 conference as part of the Think Tank 2022 forum, Mr. Yamazaki, the European coordinator of IAAP, said that the International Association of Academicians for Peace was established in South Korea in 2020 as one of the UPF's peace initiatives that brings together academics and scientists. In 2021, UPF, together with PWPA, launched a local branch of the International Association of Academicians for Peace (IAAP) in the Philippines. 
 Sun Hwa Arts School
 Sun Moon University
 Sun Myung Moon Institute
 The Unification Theological Seminary (UTS) is the main seminary of the international Unification movement. It is located in Barrytown, New York, and has an Extension Center in midtown Manhattan. Its purpose has been described as training leaders and theologians within the movement.  The seminary's first classes were offered in September 1975.  The institution's regional accreditation by the Middle States Commission on Higher Education first granted in 1996 was reaffirmed in 2016.  While most of the UTS's students have been Unification Church members, a growing number come from diverse churches and faiths. The seminary's professors come from a wide range of faiths, including a Rabbi, a Sheikh, a Methodist minister, a Presbyterian, and a Roman Catholic priest.  In 2003, the seminary had about 120 students from around the world, with most coming from South Korea and Japan, which have large numbers of Unification Church members.
 New Hope AcademyLandover Hills, Maryland, US. "Although New Hope Academy was founded in 1990 by members of the Unification movement, it is not a sectarian school. No doctrines are taught; in fact, no classes in religion are offered.However morning services are mandatory, during services discussions about religious doctrines, hymns, and group prayers all take place. We believe it is the job of parentswith the support of their church, temple, or mosqueto impart their personal faith to their child."
 WUF – World University Federation
 Several UC-related groups are working to promote sexual abstinence until marriage and fidelity in marriage and to prevent child exploitation; they care for victims of Thailand's sex trade as well. In 1996, members of the Unification Church gathered 3,500 signatures in an anti-pornography campaign.

Arts-related organizations 

 Kirov Academy of Ballet, dance school in Washington, D.C.
 Little Angels Children's Folk Ballet of Korea, a dance troupe founded in 1962 by Moon and otherUnification Churchmembers to project a positive image of South Korea to the world. In 1973 they performed at the Headquarters of the United Nations in New York City. The group's dances are based on Korean legends and regional dances, and its costumes on traditional Korean styles.
 Manhattan Center, Theater and recording studio in New York City.
 New York City Symphony
 The Universal Ballet, founded South Korea in 1984, is one of only four professional ballet companies in South Korea. The company performs a repertory that includes many full length classical story ballets, together with shorter contemporary works and original full-length Korean ballets created especially for the company. It is supported byUnification Churchmembers with Moon's daughter-in-law Julia Moon, who was the company's prima ballerina until 2001, now serving as General Director.
 The International Association of Arts and Culture for Peace (IAACP) was created and operates as one of the specialized organizations of the UPF.

Sports organizations 

 Centro Esportivo Nova Esperança, Clube Atlético Sorocaba, Brazilian football teams.
 Peace Cup International football (soccer) tournament.
 Seongnam Ilhwa Chunma, South Korean football team.
 The Sunmoon Peace Football Foundation founded by theUnification Churchin 2003 sponsors the Peace Cup, an invitational preseason friendly association football tournament for club teams, currently held every two years. It is contested by the eight clubs from several continents, though 12 teams participated in 2009. The first three competitions were held in South Korea, and the 2009 Peace Cup Andalucia was held in Madrid and Andalusia, Spain. In 1989, Moon founded Seongnam FC, a South Korean football team.

Political organizations 

 Freedom Leadership Foundation, an anti-communist organization in the United States active in the 1960s, 1970s, and 1980s.
 Peace United Family Party, a South Korean political party founded by the Sun Myung Moon, one of whose main goals is the reunification of Korea.
 The International Association of Parliamentarians for Peace (IAPP) works to promote peace and understanding between potentially hostile nations. More than a hundred parliamentarians from about 40 countries of the world announced a resolution on the establishment of the International Association of Parliamentarians for Peace IAPP in the National Assembly of South Korea in February 2016 at an international conference. Since its foundation, IAPP has spread to all continents of the world. In Uganda, the IAPP was established in 2017 in the national parliament with the participation of several legislators. The Speaker of the Parliament of Ghana, Mr. Bagbin, supported the establishment of the International Association of Parliamentary Members for Peace, IAPP, in May 2021. The establishment of the International Association of Parliamentarians for Peace (IAPP) in Liberia 2018 was supported by Dr. Roland of the Parliamentary Committee on Peace, Religion and National Reconciliation. 
 Podgorica club was founded at the beginning of 2019 in Podgorica, Montenegro. Members of the Podgorica club are former presidents and prime ministers of the countries of the Balkan region, such as former Montenegrin president Vujanovic, former Bosnian prime minister Lagumdja, former Slovenian president Turk, former Croatian president Mesic, former Serbian president Micic, former Albanian president Moisiu and other prominent politicians from the Balkans area. The founding of the Podgorica Club followed the world summits in South Korea, organized by the Universal Peace Federation, which were attended by politicians from the Balkans, such as former President Vujanovic and former Albanian President Moisiu.
 TheConservatives.com, a former political website in partnership with the Heritage Foundation. 
 The Summit Council for World Peace is an international group active in Moon's effort to unite North and South Korea.
 Coalition for a Free World, anti-Soviet group active in the 1980s.
 Washington Institute for Values in Public Policy
 CAUSA International is an anti-communist educational organization created in New York City in 1980 by members of the Unification movement.  In the 1980s it was active in 21 countries. In the United States it sponsored educational conferences for evangelical and fundamentalist Christian leaders as well as seminars and conferences for Senate staffers, Hispanic Americans and conservative activists. In 1986 it produced the anti-Communist documentary film Nicaragua Was Our Home.
 Rally of hope was launched in 2020 with the goal of connecting people around the world live online. At the Rally of Hope, experts talk about major world problems such as climate change, the Covid 19 crisis, geopolitics and more. Rallies of Hope was attended by millions of people around the world, and some of the speakers were former United Nations Secretary General Ki-Moon, former US Vice President Pence, former US Secretary of State Pompeo and other politicians. Rally of Hope is sponsored by UPF.  
 The International Coalition for Religious Freedom is an activist organization based in Virginia, the United States. Its president is Dan Fefferman, who has held several leadership positions within the Unification Church of the United States.  Founded in the 1980s, it has been active in protesting what it considers to be threats to religious freedom by governmental agencies.
 International Federation for Victory over Communism (IFVOC)
 Korean Culture and Freedom Foundation, a nonprofit organization which in the 1970s staged a public diplomacy campaign in the United States for South Korea  When it was founded in 1964, former U.S. Presidents Harry S. Truman and Dwight D. Eisenhower were named as honorary presidents and former Vice President Richard Nixon (then practicing corporate law) was named as a director.
 National Committee Against Religious Bigotry and Racism
 National Prayer and Fast Committee, which supported President Richard Nixon during the Watergate scandal.
 Radio Free Asia. 
 Think Tank 2022, launched in May 2022, is a global network that brings together thousands of experts with the aim of seeking solutions for achieving peace on the Korean Peninsula. The initiative was supported by many world leaders such as former UN Secretary General Ki-Moon, former US Vice President Pence, former US Secretary of State Pompeo, Cambodian Prime Minister Hun Sen, former U.S. Speaker of the House of Representatives Gingrich and others. Think Tank 2022 operates through expert groups and in cooperation with international UPF associations. 
 The World Summit is a UPF project that aims to bring together the heads of state, who with their vast experience and wisdom can help build a world of mutual understanding, sustainable peace and prosperity for all. Former Nigerian President Goodluck Jonathan delivered the opening speech at the 2019 International Peace Summit in Sao Tome and Principe. The conference was attended by several current and former African leaders, such as the president and prime minister of Sao Tome, the former president of Niger and the former president of Guinea-Bissau. Peace, security and human development were discussed at the 2020 World Summit in South Korea. The Summit was attended by the Prime Minister of Cambodia Hun Sen, former UN Secretary General Ban Ki Moon, former President of Nigeria Goodluck Jonathan, Newt Gingrich, former President of the US Congress and many other world leaders. In February 2022, a global forum was held to discuss the establishment of peace on the Korean Peninsula. This forum is part of the World Peace Summit 2022 in South Korea. The UPF and the Royal Government of Cambodia have convened the World Summit for Peace on the Korean Peninsula 2022 in South Korea. Former US President Trump, Sall, President of Senegal, former US Secretary of State Pompeo, former US Congress President Gingrich, former European Commission President Barroso, and numerous other world leaders took part in the summit, live or via video. UPF organized a world summit for peace in August 2022 in South Korea. The summit was attended by several world leaders such as former Canadian Prime Minister Harper, former President of the US Congress Gingrich, former US Secretary of State Pompeo and others. The participants of the summit gave their support to building peace in the world, especially on the Korean Peninsula. Religious freedom was also discussed at the Summit and support was given to the education of young people in Africa. 
 The International Summit Council for Peace (ISCP) was launched in 2019 in South Korea with the aim of bringing together former and current heads of government and state. Among the participants of the inaugural meeting were former US Vice President Cheney, former Speaker of the US House of Representatives Gingrich, former President of Albania Moisiu, former President of Paraguay Gómez and other former and current presidents.   ISCP continues to work on the foundations of the World Peace Summit, established in 1987. Goodluck Jonathan, the former president of Nigeria, became the chairman of the ISCP-Africa International Summit Council for Peace, an organization made up of former African presidents. At the opening ceremony of the Asia-Pacific Summit 2019, Cambodian Prime Minister Hun Sen signed the Resolution on the launch of the International Summit Council for Peace (ISCP). The Prime Minister of Cambodia, Hun Sen, delivered the keynote speech at the International Summit Council for Peace Council (ISCP) in 2022. Hun Sen proposed that the two Koreas should begin to cooperate through UNESCO, to cooperate culturally and to change the demilitarized zone into a zone of peace. The International Summit Council for Peace (ISCP)-Africa discussed the issue of COVID-19 in Africa and pledged support for the efforts of African countries in curbing the spread of the COVID-19 pandemic. They called on the international community to help people in Africa fight against COVID-19 with medical supplies. ICSP Africa stands for good governance on the African continent and the organization gathers former African presidents. At the Sao Tome Peace Summit 2019, Goodluck Jonathan stated that the goals of the International Summit Council for Peace (ISCP) coincided with his personal goals and ideals of strengthening democracy, peace and stability by supporting the youth of Africa. The former president of Nigeria, Goodluck Jonathan, at the 2020 world summit in South Korea, led the session of the International Summit Council for Peace (ISCP), where former and current heads of governments discussed current problems in the world.

Businesses 

The Unification Church controls a large number of businesses around the world. In 1997 David Bromley, a sociologist at Virginia Commonwealth University, said:  "The corporate section is understood to be the engine that funds the mission of the church. The wealth base is fairly substantial. But if you were to compare it to the LDS Church or the Catholic Church or other churches that have massive landholdings, this doesn't look on a global scale like a massive operation."

The lines between the Church's charities, businesses, religious activities, and related organizations is blurred with money and goods flowing between them. Money is in general believed to flow from East Asia to the United States although these flows are opaque. In the 1990s One Up Enterprises Inc. was the Church's primary American holding company. Business are owned by the Church through arcane corporate structures with many ultimately controlled by the holding company Unification Church International Inc.

 The International Association for Peace and Economic Development (IAED) was created and operates as one of the specialized UPF organizations.  At the first virtual International Leadership Conference (ILC) in September 2020, organized by UPF, the work of the International Association for Peace and Economic Development (IAED) was presented.

Automotive 

Pyeonghwa Motors is an automobile manufacturer based in Seoul, South Korea, and owned by the movement. It is involved in a joint-venture with the North Korean Ryonbong General Corp. The joint venture produces two small cars under license from Fiat, and a pick-up truck and an SUV using complete knock down kits from Chinese manufacturer Dandong Shuguang.  Pyeonghwa has the exclusive rights to car production, purchase, and sale of used cars in North Korea. However, most North Koreans are unable to afford a car. Because of the very small market for cars in the country, Pyeonghwa's output is reportedly very low. In 2003, only 314 cars were produced even though the factory had the facilities to produce up to 10,000 cars a year. Erik van Ingen Schenau, author of the book Automobiles Made in North Korea, has estimated the company's total production in 2005 at not more than around 400 units.

Health care 

 Cheongshim Hospital, Korean hospital.
 Ilhwa Company, South Korean based producer of ginseng and related products.
 Isshin Hospital, Church sponsored hospital in Japan which practices both modern and traditional Asian medicine.

Manufacturing 

In South Korea the Tongil Group was founded in 1963 by Sun Myung Moon as a nonprofit organization which would provide revenue for the movement.  Its core focus was manufacturing but in the 1970s and 1980s it expanded by founding or acquiring businesses in pharmaceuticals, tourism, and publishing.  In the 1990s Tongil Group suffered as a result of the 1997 Asian Financial Crisis.  By 2004 it was losing money and was $3.6 billion in debt. In 2005 Sun Myung Moon's son, Kook-jin Moon was appointed chairman of Tongil Group.  Among Tongil Group's chief holdings are:  The Ilwha Company, which produces ginseng and related products; Ilshin Stone, building materials; and Tongil Heavy Industries, machine parts including hardware for the South Korean military. The Tongil Group funds the Tongil Foundation which supports Unification movement projects including schools and the Little Angels Children's Folk Ballet of Korea.

Shipbuilding 

The Church owns Master Marine, a shipbuilding and fishing company in Alabama; International Seafood of Kodiak, Alaska; In 2011 Master Marine opened a factory in Las Vegas, Nevada, to manufacture a 27-foot pleasure boat designed by Moon.

Seafood
The Church owns True World Foods, which controls a major portion of the sushi trade in the US. True World Foods parent company is the corporate conglomerate True World Group which operates restaurants and markets.

The Church's foray into the seafood industry began at the direction of Reverend Moon who ordered an expansion into "the oceanic providence." In 1976 and 1977 the Church invested nearly a million dollars into the American seafood industry. Moon delivered a speech in 1980 entitled "The Way of Tuna" in which he claimed that "After we build the boats, we catch the fish and process them for the market, and then have a distribution network. This is not just on the drawing board; I have already done it." and declared himself the "king of the ocean." He also suggested that they could get around the recently imposed 200 nautical mile exclusive economic zone by marrying American and Japanese members allowing the Japanese ones to become American citizens, because once married "we are not foreigners; therefore Japanese brothers, particularly those matched to Americans, are becoming ..... leaders for fishing and distribution." He also declared that "Gloucester is almost a Moonie town now!"

Later in 1980 Moon gave a sermon in which he said that "This ocean business is really reserved for Unification Church. How much income would this business generate? Roughly speaking, enough money to buy the entire world. That's true! It has unlimited potential." In 1986 he advised his followers to open a thousand restaurants in America.

Agriculture 
The Church owns a chinchilla farm named One Mind Farms.

Media 

News World Communications is an international news media corporation. It was founded in New York City, in 1976, by Sun Myung Moon. Its first two newspapers, The News World (later renamed the New York City Tribune) and the Spanish-language Noticias del Mundo, were published in New York from 1976 until the early 1990s.  In 1982 The New York Times described News World as "the newspaper unit of the Unification Church." Moon's son Hyun Jin Moon is its chairman of the board.  News World Communications owns United Press International, The World and I, Tiempos del Mundo (Latin America), The Segye Ilbo (South Korea), The Sekai Nippo (Japan), the Zambezi Times (South Africa), The Middle East Times (Egypt). Until 2008 it published the Washington, D.C.-based newsmagazine Insight on the News. Until 2010, it owned The Washington Times. On November 2, 2010, Sun Myung Moon and a group of former Times editors purchased the paper from News World.

 AmericanLife TV cable television network formerly owned by the Unification movement.
 The International Media Association for Peace was founded and operates as one of the peace associations of the UPF.

Real estate 

In the 1970s the Unification Church of the United States began making major real estate investments. Church buildings were purchased around the nation. In New York State the Belvedere Estate, the Unification Theological Seminary, and the New Yorker Hotel were purchased. The international headquarters of the church was established in New York City. In Washington, D.C., the church purchased a church building from the Church of Jesus Christ of Latter-day Saints, and in Seattle the historic Rolland Denny mansion  for $175,000 in 1977. In 1991 Donald Trump criticized Unification Church real estate investments as possibly disruptive to communities.  As of December 1994, Unification Church had invested $150 million in Uruguay. Members own the country's largest hotel, one of its leading banks, the second-largest newspaper and two of the largest printing plants.  In 2008 church related real estate investment partnership USP Rockets LLC was active in Richmond, Virginia.  In 2011 the church related National Hospitality Corporation sold the Sheraton National Hotel. U.S. Property Development Corporation, real estate investment
Yongpyong Resort, which hosted the alpine skiing events for the 2018 Winter Olympics and Paralympics.

United Nations-related non-governmental organizations 

From 2000 until his death in 2012, Moon promoted the creation of an interreligious council at the United Nations as a check and balance to its political-only structure. Since then King Abdullah of Saudi Arabia and King Juan Carlos I of Spain hosted officially a program to promote the proposal.  Moon's Universal Peace Federation is in special consultative status with the United Nations Economic and Social Council and a member of the UN Commission on Sustainable Development, a member of the United Nations Division for Palestinian Rights, a member of the United Nations Human Rights Council, a member of the UNHRC, a member of the United Nations Department of Economic and Social Affairs and United Nations Economic and Social Commission for Asia and the Pacific.
Three of Moon's non-governmental organizations (NGOs)Universal Peace Federation, Women's Federation for World Peace and Service for Peaceare in consultative status with the United Nations Economic and Social Council.

Other organizations 

 International Relief Friendship Foundation (IRFF)
 Joshua House Children's Centre in Georgetown, Guyana helps homeless and victimized children.
 Korean War 60th Anniversary Memorial Committee
 National Committee Against Religious Bigotry and Racism
 The New Hope East Garden Project(새소망농장), agricultural project in Brazil.
 Ocean Church
 Summit Council for World Peace
 Tongil Foundation
 World Media Association, sponsors trips for American journalists to Asian countries.

Organizations which are supported by the members of the Unification Movement 

 American Conference on Religious Movements, a Rockville, Maryland-based group that fights discrimination against new religions. The group is funded by the Church of Scientology, the Hare Krishna organization, as well as by Unificationists, who give it $3,000 a month.
 American Freedom Coalition (AFC), a group which seeks to unite American conservatives on the state level to work toward common goals. The coalition, while independent, receives support from the Unification movement. American Freedom Journal was a publication of the AFC published by Robert Grant. The journal was started in 1988 and suspended publication sometime before 1994.  Contributors included Pat Buchanan, Ed Meese, Ben Wattenberg and Jeane Kirkpatrick.

 Christian Heritage Foundation, a private, independent charitable foundation based in Virginia that distributes Bibles and Christian literature to Communist and Third World nations. In 1995 it was given $3.5 million by the Women's Federation for World Peace.
 Empowerment Network, a pro-faith political action group supported by United States Senator Joe Lieberman.
 Foundation for Religious Freedom (Also known as the New Cult Awareness Network), an organization affiliated with the Church of Scientology which states its purpose as "Educating the public as to religious rights, freedoms and responsibilities."

 George Bush Presidential Library. In June 2006 the Houston Chronicle reported that in 2004 Moon's Washington Times Foundation gave a $1 million donation to the George Bush Presidential Library.
 Geneva Interfaith and Intercultural Alliance, a Swiss association founded in 2008 under the patronage of the UN Mission of the Republic of the Philippines and the UN Mission of the Republic of Indonesia, and the Universal Peace Federation, offering programmes and intercultural training for diplomats, based on the Universal Peace Federation Ambassador for peace curriculum. 
 Liberty University. Sun Myung Moon and his wife Hak Ja Han helped to financially stabilize the university through two organizations: News World Communications, which provided a $400,000 loan to the University at 6% interest; and the Women's Federation for World Peace, which indirectly contributed $3.5 million toward the school's debt.
 Married Priests Now!, is an advocacy group headed by Archbishop Emmanuel Milingo, who was himself married by Moon.  MPN is a liberal Catholic organization calling for relaxing the rules concerning marriage in the Latin Church Catholic priesthood.
 Million Family March, 2000 rally in Washington, D.C., sponsored by the FFWPU and The Nation of Islam.
 National Conservative Political Action Committee (NCPAC), was given $500,000 by CAUSA International to finance an anticommunist lobbying campaign.
 University of Bridgeport of Bridgeport, Connecticut. In 1992, following the longest faculty strike in United States academic history, the University of Bridgeport agreed to an arrangement with the Professors World Peace Academy whereby the university would be subsidized by PWPA in exchange for control of the university. The initial agreement was for $50 million, and a majority of board members were to be PWPA members. The next University of Bridgeport president was PWPA president and Holocaust theologian Richard L. Rubenstein (from 1995 to 1999), and subsequently former U.S. HSA-UWC president Neil Albert Salonen (2000–2018).
 World Association of Non-Governmental Organizations (WANGO)

See also 

 Blessing ceremony of the Unification Church
 List of Unification movement people
 Unification Church of the United States
 Millennialism
 Theocracy
 Utopianism
P'ikareum

References

Bibliography 

 Sontag, Frederick. 1977. Sun Myung Moon and the Unification Church, Abingdon Press. 
 Bryant, M. Darrol, and Herbert Warren Richardson. 1978. A Time for consideration: a scholarly appraisal of the Unification Church. New York: E. Mellen Press. 
 Tingle, D. and Fordyce, R. 1979, Phases and Faces of the Moon: A Critical Examination of the Unification Church and its Principles, Hicksville, NY: Exposition Press 
 Kim, Young Oon, 1980, Unification Theology, Barrytown, NY: Unification Theological Seminary,  
 Matczak, Sebastian, Unificationism: A New Philosophy and World View (Philosophical Questions Series, No 11) (1982) New York: Louvain. 
 Barker, Eileen, The Making of a Moonie: Choice or Brainwashing? (1984) Blackwell's, Oxford, UK .
 Bjornstad, James. 1984. Sun Myung & the Unification Church. Rev. ed. Minneapolis, Minn.: Bethany House Publishers. 57 p. N.B.: Rev. ed. of The Moon Is Not the Sun, which had been published in 1976. 
 Durst, Mose. 1984. To bigotry, no sanction: Reverend Sun Myung Moon and the Unification Church. Chicago: Regnery Gateway. 
 
 Fichter, Joseph Henry. 1985. The holy family of father Moon. Kansas City, Mo: Leaven Press. 
 Gullery, Jonathan. 1986. The Path of a pioneer: the early days of Reverend Sun Myung Moon and the Unification Church. New York: HSA Publications. 
 Biermans, J. 1986, The Odyssey of New Religious Movements, Persecution, Struggle, Legitimation: A Case Study of the Unification Church Lewiston, New York and Queenston, Ontario: The Edwin Melton Press 
 Sherwood, Carlton. 1991. Inquisition: The Persecution and Prosecution of the Reverend Sun Myung Moon. Washington, D.C.: Regnery Gateway. 
 Chryssides, George D., The Advent of Sun Myung Moon: The Origins, Beliefs and Practices of the Unification Church (1991) London, Macmillan Professional and Academic Ltd. The author is professor of religious studies at the University of Wolverhampton, United Kingdom.
 Yamamoto, J. Isamu, 1995, Unification Church, Grand Rapids, Michigan: Zondervan 
 Hong, Nansook, In the Shadow of the Moons: My Life in the Reverend Sun Myung Moon's Family.
 Introvigne, M., 2000, The Unification Church, Signature Books, 
 Ward, Thomas J. 2006, March to Moscow: the role of the Reverend Sun Myung Moon in the collapse of communism. St. Paul, Minn: Paragon House. 
 Hickey, Patrick 2009, Tahoe Boy: A journey back home. John, Maryland: Seven Locks Press.  
 Moon, Sun Myung, 2009, As a Peace-Loving Global Citizen. Gimm-Young Publishers

External links

 UPF website
 www.Tparents.org
 Universal Peace Federation
 Family Federation for World Peace and Unification USA 

 
New religious movements
1954 establishments in South Korea
Anti-communism
Anti-communism in South Korea
Anti-Marxism
Antisemitism
Anti-Japanese sentiment in South Korea
Anti-South Korean sentiment in Japan
Cults
Christian new religious movements
Conservatism in Japan
Conservatism in South Korea
Discrimination against LGBT people in South Korea
Far-right politics in South Korea